Winden am See is a town in the district of Neusiedl am See in the Austrian state of Burgenland.

Population

References

Cities and towns in Neusiedl am See District